Schnelle is a surname. Notable people with the surname include:

 Fanny Schnelle (1866–1953), Norwegian politician
 Udo Schnelle (born 1952), German Lutheran theologian

See also
 Schneller